Postplatyptilia eelkoi is a moth of the family Pterophoridae. It is known from Chile.

The wingspan is 16–18 mm. Adults are on wing in December and January.

References

eelkoi
Moths described in 1991
Endemic fauna of Chile